Phyllostachys bissetii  is a species of bamboo found in Sichuan, Zhejiang provinces of China and introduced elsewhere. It is among the most cold-hardy bamboos. Its culms are relatively thin for its height in comparison to other running bamboo species.

References

External links
 
 

bissetii
Flora of China